Strictispira is a genus of sea snails, marine gastropod mollusks in the family Pseudomelatomidae, the turrids and allies.

Taxonomy
Previously this genus was included in the family Turridae, subfamily Strictispirinae. Taylor et al. (1993) elevated this subfamily to the rank of family Strictispiridae. M.G. Faber (2007) stated that these species were conchological identical to Crassispira, but differ by a different radula type and buccal mass. But then he opinioned that this did not reflect a deep, subfamily-level phylogeny.

Species
Species within the genus Strictispira include:
 † Strictispira acurugata (Dall, 1890) 
 Strictispira coltrorum Tippett, 2006
 Strictispira drangai (Schwengel, 1951)
 Strictispira ericana (Hertlein & A. M. Strong, 1951)
 Strictispira paxillus (Reeve, 1845)
 Strictispira redferni Tippett, 2006
 Strictispira stillmani Shasky, 1971
Species brought into synonymy
 Strictispira solida (C. B. Adams, 1850) : synonym of Clathrodrillia solida (C. B. Adams, 1850)

References

External links
 McLean, J.H. (1971) A revised classification of the family Turridae, with the proposal of new subfamilies, genera, and subgenera from the Eastern Pacific. The Veliger, 14, 114–130
 
 Bouchet, P.; Kantor, Y. I.; Sysoev, A.; Puillandre, N. (2011). A new operational classification of the Conoidea (Gastropoda). Journal of Molluscan Studies. 77(3): 273-308
 Worldwide Mollusc Species Data Base: Pseudomelatomidae

 
Pseudomelatomidae
Gastropod genera